Cristina Popescu (born 15 April 1996) is a Romanian rower. She competed in the women's coxless four event at the 2020 Summer Olympics.

References

External links
 

1996 births
Living people
Romanian female rowers
Olympic rowers of Romania
Rowers at the 2020 Summer Olympics
Sportspeople from Târgu Jiu
Rowers at the 2014 Summer Youth Olympics